Ramindu de Silva (born 16 July 1996) is a Sri Lankan cricketer. He made his first-class debut for Nondescripts Cricket Club in the 2016–17 Premier League Tournament on 11 January 2017.

References

External links
 

1996 births
Living people
Sri Lankan cricketers
Nondescripts Cricket Club cricketers
Sportspeople from Galle